The women's hammer throw event at the 2015 Military World Games was held on 7 October at the KAFAC Sports Complex.

Records
Prior to this competition, the existing world and CISM record were as follows:

Schedule

Medalists

Results

Final

References

hammer throw
2015 in women's athletics